Aleuritopteris albofusca is a species of fern in the family Pteridaceae. It is endemic to China, including Tibet. Its natural habitat is subtropical or tropical dry forests. It is threatened by habitat loss.

References

Flora of China
albofusca
Vulnerable plants
Taxonomy articles created by Polbot
Plants described in 1895